François Richard (ca. 15851650) was a French composer of airs de cour. His Airs de cour a quatre parties (1637) mentions the pleasure Louis XIII found in the music of his Chamber.

Works, editions and recordings
Airs de cour avec la tablature de luth 1637
Airs de cour a quatre parties 1637
Amarante Céline Scheen Eduardo Egüez, Flora 2010

References

1580s births
1650 deaths
French Baroque composers
17th-century classical composers
French classical composers
French male classical composers
17th-century male musicians